The Oslo Cup (formerly the Radisson SAS Oslo Cup, the Weber Oslo Cup and the Radisson Blu Oslo Cup) is an annual curling tournament, held in September in Oslo. It is one of the first curling tournaments of the World Curling Tour season. After the 2012 edition, the event was put on hiatus for ten years before returning in 2022.

Past champions

Men

Women

Notes

References

External links
Curling Norway Website

Former World Curling Tour events
Sport in Oslo
 
International sports competitions hosted by Norway